"When I Lost You" is the debut single of English singer-songwriter Sarah Whatmore, written and produced by Richard Stannard. The song was originally due to be included on her debut album; however, her record company decided to pull the album. The song was originally written for Kylie Minogue's album Fever (2001).

The single was released on CD on 9 September 2002 in the United Kingdom. It peaked at number six on the UK Singles Chart in September 2002 and number 32 in Ireland the next month. In Australia, the song was released on 10 March 2003 and made a brief appearance on the ARIA Singles Chart, peaking at number 49 in May 2003.

Track listings
UK and Irish CD single
 "When I Lost You"
 "Are You Ready for Love"
 "When I Lost You" (M*A*S*H master mix)
 "When I Lost You" (video)

UK 12-inch single
A. "When I Lost You" (K-Klass Ultimate vocal mix)
B. "When I Lost You" (Flatline's Whatever Next?... Monkey Tennis vocal mix)

UK cassette single
 "When I Lost You"
 "Are You Ready for Love"

Australian CD single
 "When I Lost You"
 "Are You Ready for Love"
 "When I Lost You" (M*A*S*H master mix)
 "When I Lost You" (K-Klass ultimate vocal mix)
 "When I Lost You" (video)

Charts

Weekly charts

Year-end charts

Release history

References

19 Recordings singles
2002 debut singles
2002 songs
Bertelsmann Music Group singles
RCA Records singles
Sarah Whatmore songs
Songs about loneliness
Songs written by Richard Stannard (songwriter)